Matthew Diamond (born November 26, 1951) is an American film and television director, producer and choreographer best known for directing Dancemaker.

Life and career
Matthew Diamond was born in New York City, the son of Irwin and Pearl (née Ziffer) Diamond. He graduated from City College of New York with a B.A. in 1972 and attended the School of Performing Arts in New York City. He began his career as a dancer with the Louis Falco Dance Company from 1970–74, Jennifer Muller and the Works from 1975–76 and the Batsheva Dance Company, Tel Aviv, Israel, in 1978. He was choreographer for the Bat–Dor Dance Company, and co-founded the dance company Diamond where he served as cofounder (with Maria Loffredo), artistic director, and choreographer from 1979–83. He also served as opera director for Children's Free Opera in 1983. He also choreographed for dance companies including The Washington Ballet, Batsheva Dance Company and Bat-Dor Dance Company of Israel. Diamond's choreography has been presented at Carnegie Hall, Jacob’s Pillow and the Brooklyn Academy of Music. Choreographer Tere O'Connor danced in his company before becoming a choreographer on his own.

Diamond was nominated for an Academy Award in 1999 for directing the documentary film Dancemaker. As well as being nominated for several Primetime Emmy Awards, Daytime Emmy Awards, DGA Awards, he won a prize for his work at the San Francisco International Film Festival.

Choreography
Selected works include:
3 of Diamond's, 1977
Handful of Diamond's, 1978
3 by Matthew Diamond, 1978

Choreography for films includes:
Phi Beta Rockers, 1982
Splitz, Film Ventures International, 1984
Maxie, Orion, 1985

Directing credits

  General Hospital
 Guiding Light
 Desperate Housewives
 Men in Trees
 Help Me Help You
 My Boys
 Gilmore Girls
 That's So Raven
 Scrubs
 Oh Baby
 The Parkers
 Linc's
 CBS Schoolbreak Special
 ABC Weekend Specials
 Café Americain, Anything but Love
 The Golden Girls
 Doogie Howser, M.D.
 A Different World
 Designing Women
 The Hughleys 
 Just Shoot Me!
 The Naked Truth 
 Sister, Sister
 Living Single
 Family Ties
 The Pitts
 Daddio
 Rude Awakening
 The Secret Diary of Desmond Pfeiffer
 Two Guys, a Girl and a Pizza Place
 Homeboys in Outer Space
 Down the Shore
 Drexell's Class
 Working Girl
 My Two Dads
 My Sister Sam
 So You Think You Can Dance
 The Oogieloves in the Big Balloon Adventure
 Lullabye
 Camp Rock

References

External links
 
 Interview with Matthew Diamond from PBS' Great Performances

1951 births
American choreographers
American television directors
Television producers from New York City
Living people
People from Manhattan
Film directors from New York City
Primetime Emmy Award winners